David Einhorn may refer to:

 David Einhorn (rabbi) (1809–1879), leader of the Jewish reform movement in the U.S.
 David Einhorn (hedge fund manager) (born 1968), founder of Greenlight Capital